The Cuppett's Covered Bridge, built by Cuppett brothers William & Phillip on September 14, 1882, is a historic wooden covered bridge located in Napier Township, Bedford County, Pennsylvania.

History and features
Privately owned by the Cuppett family from the day it was built, the bridge took just five months to be built for a total cost of $780. The family signed the contract on April 7, 1882. John Wayde completed the masonry work and Jeremiah Thompson was in charge of the woodwork. 

Crossing Dunnings Creek, the  bridge is a unique and tasteful design with unusually low arches and low side walls which show off the patented Burr Arch Truss system. It is reportedly one of the finest and most well-cared-for of the fourteen historic covered bridges in Bedford County.

The Cuppett's Covered Bridge was listed on the U.S. National Register of Historic Places in 1980 by the United States Department of the Interior.

Gallery

References 

Covered bridges on the National Register of Historic Places in Pennsylvania
Covered bridges in Bedford County, Pennsylvania
Wooden bridges in Pennsylvania
Bridges in Bedford County, Pennsylvania
National Register of Historic Places in Bedford County, Pennsylvania
Road bridges on the National Register of Historic Places in Pennsylvania
Burr Truss bridges in the United States